Wigtoft is a village and civil parish in Lincolnshire, England. Included in Wigtoft civil parish are the hamlets of Asperton and Burtoft.

The name 'Wigtoft' derives from the Old Norse and Old English, vik-toft, meaning 'curtilage by a creek'.

Wigtoft is one of eighteen parishes which, together with Boston, form the Borough of Boston. The local government has been arranged in this way since the reorganisation of 1 April 1974, which resulted from the Local Government Act 1972. This parish forms part of the Five Villages electoral ward.

Previously, the parish had formed part of Boston Rural District, in the Parts of Holland. Holland was one of the three divisions (formally known as parts) of the traditional county of Lincolnshire. Since the Local Government Act of 1888, Holland had been in most respects, a county in itself.

The parish church is a Grade I listed building dedicated to Saint Peter and Saint Paul and dating from the 12th to 15th centuries and restored in 1891.

References

External links

Villages in Lincolnshire
Civil parishes in Lincolnshire
Borough of Boston